Anastrepha hamata is a species of tephritid or fruit flies in the genus Anastrepha of the family Tephritidae.

References

Trypetinae